In mathematics, projectivization is a procedure which associates with a non-zero vector space V a projective space , whose elements are one-dimensional subspaces of V. More generally, any subset S of V closed under scalar multiplication defines a subset of  formed by the lines contained in S and is called the projectivization of S.

Properties 
 Projectivization is a special case of the factorization by a group action: the projective space  is the quotient of the open set V\{0} of nonzero vectors by the action of the multiplicative group of the base field by scalar transformations.
 Projectivization is functorial with respect to injective linear maps: if

 

 is a linear map with trivial kernel then f defines an algebraic map of the corresponding projective spaces,

 

 In particular, the general linear group GL(V) acts on the projective space  by automorphisms.

Projective completion 

A related procedure embeds a vector space V over a field K into the projective space  of the same dimension.

Generalization 

In algebraic geometry, there is a procedure that associates a projective variety Proj S with a graded commutative algebra S (under some technical restrictions on S). If S is the algebra of polynomials on a vector space V then Proj S is  This Proj construction gives rise to a contravariant functor from the category of graded commutative rings and surjective graded maps to the category of projective schemes.

Projective geometry
Linear algebra